Undisputed WWE Tag Team  Championship refers to both of the following:
 WWE Raw Tag Team Championship, the men's tag team championship of WWE's Raw brand
 WWE SmackDown Tag Team Championship, the men's tag team championship of WWE's SmackDown brand

In the American professional wrestling promotion WWE, the term refers to the tag team or wrestler's who hold and defend both championships together, although both titles retain their individual lineages.